Kristine Kathryn Rusch (born June 4, 1960) is an American writer and editor. She writes under various pseudonyms in multiple genres, including science fiction, fantasy, mystery, romance, and mainstream.

Rusch won the Hugo Award for Best Novelette in 2001 for her story "Millennium Babies" and the 2003 Endeavour Award for The Disappeared 2002. Her story "Recovering Apollo 8" won the Sidewise Award for Alternate History (short form) in 2008. Her novel The Enemy Within won the Sidewise (long form) in 2015. She is married to fellow writer Dean Wesley Smith; they have collaborated on several works.

She edited The Magazine of Fantasy and Science Fiction for six years, from mid-1991 through mid-1997, winning one Hugo Award as Best Professional Editor. Rusch and Smith operated Pulphouse Publishing for many years and edited the original (hardback) incarnation of Pulphouse Magazine; they won a World Fantasy Award in 1989.

Beginning in July 2010, Rusch had a regular column in the bi-monthly Grantville Gazette e-zine called Notes from The Buffer Zone until the magazine's demise in August 2022.

Rusch became a Writer Judge for the Writers of the Future contest in 2010.

Bibliography

The Diving Universe 

Novels:
Diving into the Wreck, Pyr Books, 2009, 
City of Ruins, Pyr Books, 2011, 
Boneyards, Pyr Books, January 2012, 
Skirmishes, WMG Publishing, September 2013, 
The Falls, WMG Publishing 2016, 
The Runabout, Asimov's cover story May/June 2017, WMG Publishing 2017, 
The Renegat, WMG Publishing 2019, 
Squishy's Teams, WMG Publishing 2020, 
Thieves, WMG Publishing 2021, 

Novellas:
Diving into The Wreck, Asimov's cover story, December 2005
Room of Lost Souls, Asimov's cover story, April/May 2008
The Spires of Denon, Asimov's cover story, April/May 2009; WMG Publishing 2019, 
Becoming One With The Ghosts, Asimov's, October/November 2010
Becalmed, Asimov's, April/May 2011, 
Stealth, Asimov's, October/November 2011
Strangers at the Room of Lost Souls, WMG Publishing, 2013
Dix, Asimov's cover story March/April 2018
Joyride, Asimov's, November/December 2018

The Fey Universe

The Fey 
 Vol. 1: The Sacrifice, 1995 (Illustrated by David O'Connor (illustrator), Dawn Wilson in 1996, and Albin Egger-Lienz in 2001)
 Vol. 2: The Changeling, 1996 (Illustrated by Anne Yvonne Gilbert)
 Vol. 3: The Rival, 1997 (Illustrated by Anne Yvonne Gilbert)
 Vol. 4: The Resistance, 1998 (Illustrated by Anne Yvonne Gilbert)
 Vol. 5: Victory, 1998 (Illustrated by Anne Yvonne Gilbert)

Black Throne 

 Vol. 1: The Black Queen, 1999
 Vol. 2: The Black King, 2000

Retrieval Artist 
Vol. 1: The Disappeared, 2002
Vol. 2: Extremes, 2003
Vol. 3: Consequences, 2004
Vol. 4: Buried Deep, 2005
Vol. 5: Paloma, 2006
Vol. 6: Recovery Man, 2007
Vol. 7: Duplicate Effort, 2009
Vol. 8: Anniversary Day: Anniversary Day Saga, Book 1, 2011
Vol. 9: Blowback: Anniversary Day Saga, Book 2, 2012
Vol. 10: A Murder of Clones: Anniversary Day Saga, Book 3, 2015
Vol. 11: Search & Recovery: Anniversary Day Saga, Book 4, 2015
Vol. 12: The Peyti Crisis: Anniversary Day Saga, Book 5, 2015 
Vol. 13: Vigilantes: Anniversary Day Saga, Book 6 , 2015 
Vol. 14: Starbase Human: Anniversary Day Saga, Book 7, 2015
Vol. 15: Masterminds: Anniversary Day Saga, Book 8, 2015

Star Wars 

The New Rebellion, 1996

Stand-alone novels 

The Gallery of His Dreams, 1991
The White Mists of Power, 1991
Heart Readers, 1993
Façade, 1993
Traitors, 1993
Alien Influences, 1994
Sins of the Blood, 1994
The Devil's Churn, 1996
Fantasy Life, 2003
The Tower, 2013
The Enemy Within, 2014

Short fiction 
Collections
Stained Black, 1992
Stories for an Enchanted Afternoon, 2001
Little Miracles and Other Tales, 2001
The Retrieval Artist and Other Stories, 2002
Recovering Apollo 8 and Other Stories, 2010

Stand-along Stories
 Fighting Bob (1992) (collected in Mike Resnick's alternate history anthology Alternate Presidents)
 The Best and Brightest (1992) (collected in Mike Resnick's alternate history anthology Alternate Kennedys)
 The Arrival of Truth (1993) (collected in Mike Resnick's alternate history anthology Alternate Warriors)
 Common Sense (1994) (collected in Mike Resnick's alternate history anthology Alternate Outlaws)
 Faith (1997) (collected in Mike Resnick's alternate history anthology Alternate Tyrants)

Stories

 
 
 
 
 Novelette.

Non-fiction

Pseudonymous work

Works as Kris Rusch 
Kristine Kathryn Rusch has written one mainstream novel as "Kris Rusch".

Hitler's Angel, 1998

Works as Kris Nelscott 
Kristine Kathryn Rusch writes mystery novels using the pen-name "Kris Nelscott", featuring Smokey Dalton, an African-American unlicensed private investigator, in Memphis, Tennessee.

Smokey Dalton 
Vol. 1: A Dangerous Road, 2000
Vol. 2: Smoke-Filled Rooms, 2001
Vol. 3: Thin Walls, 2002
Vol. 4: Stone Cribs, 2004
Vol. 5: War at Home, 2005
Vol. 6: Days of Rage, 2006
Vol. 7: Street Justice, 2015

Works as Kristine Grayson 
Kristine Kathryn Rusch writes romances, under the name "Kristine Grayson".

Utterly Charming, 2000
Thoroughly Kissed, 2001
Completely Smitten, 2002
Simply Irresistible, 2003
Absolutely Captivated, 2004
Totally Spellbound, 2005
Wickedly Charming, 2011

Works as Sandy Schofield 
Kristine Kathryn Rusch and Dean Wesley Smith use the common pseudonym "Sandy Schofield" for a part of their collaborative works.

Star Trek: Deep Space Nine: The Big Game, 1993
Aliens: Rogue, 1995
Quantum Leap: The Loch Ness Leap, 1997 
Predator: Big Game, 1999

Works as Kathryn Wesley 
Kristine Kathryn Rusch and Dean Wesley Smith use the common pseudonym "Kathryn Wesley" for a part of their collaborative works.

The 10th Kingdom, 2000
Aladdin, 2000
The Monkey King, 2001
Salem Witch Trials, 2003

Collaborations with Kevin J. Anderson

Afterimage 

Vol. 1: Afterimage, 1992
Vol. 1-2: Afterimage/Aftershock, 1998

Collaborations with Jerry Oltion

Short fiction

Collaborations with Dean Wesley Smith

The Tenth Planet 

Vol. 1: The Tenth Planet, 1999
Vol. 2: The Tenth Planet: Oblivion, 2000
Vol. 3: The Tenth Planet: Final Assault, 2000

Roswell 

No Good Deed, 2001
Little Green Men, 2002

Star Trek

Classic 

The Rings of Tautee, 1996
Treaty's Law, 1997
New Earth 5: Thin Air, 2000

The Next Generation 

Klingon!, 1996
The Soldiers of Fear, 1996
Vectors: Double Helix #2, 1999

Voyager 
The Escape, 1995
Echoes, additionally with Nina Kiriki Hoffman, 1998
Section 31: Shadow, 2001

Deep Space Nine 

The Mist: The Captain's Table #3, 1998
The Long Night, 1996

Enterprise 

By the Book, 2002

X-Men 

X-Men, 2000

Article 

 "It Is Just Good Business," L. Ron Hubbard Presents Writers of the Future Volume VII, pp. 322–329. Bridge Publications: Los Angeles. 1991.

References

External links
 Official website
 

1960 births
Living people
20th-century American novelists
20th-century American women writers
21st-century American novelists
21st-century American women writers
American fantasy writers
American mystery writers
American romantic fiction writers
American science fiction writers
American women novelists
Analog Science Fiction and Fact people
Asimov's Science Fiction people
Endeavour Award winners
Hugo Award-winning writers
Science fiction editors
Sidewise Award winners
The Magazine of Fantasy & Science Fiction people
Women historical novelists
Women mystery writers
Women romantic fiction writers
Women science fiction and fantasy writers
World Fantasy Award-winning writers
Women speculative fiction editors
Conquer the World Records artists